Lavendula may refer to:
Lavendula, grandsire of My Babu
Lavendula, Houston based band, which included Arthur Yoria
Streptomyces lavendulae, produces cycloserine, a broad-spectrum antibiotic used to treat tuberculosis
Lavandula, the Lavender genus of flowering plants